The 1993–94 OB I bajnokság season was the 57th season of the OB I bajnokság, the top level of ice hockey in Hungary. Seven teams participated in the league, and Ferencvarosi TC won the championship.

Regular season

Final round

Qualification round

Playoffs

3rd place
 Újpesti TE - Dunaferr Dunaújváros 1:2 (4:3, 1:4, 1:3)

Final 
 Alba Volán Székesfehérvár - Ferencvárosi TC 0:2 (2:6, 1:8)

External links
 Season on hockeyarchives.info

OB I bajnoksag seasons
Hun
OB